The World Financial Group Classic was an annual bonspiel, or curling tournament, that took place at the Calgary Curling Club in Calgary, Alberta. The tournament was held in a triple-knockout format in its first year, but was held in a round robin format in 2011. The tournament was part of the World Curling Tour.

Past champions
Only skip's name is displayed.

References

External links
Calgary Curling Club Home

Former World Curling Tour events
Sport in Calgary
Curling in Alberta
2010 establishments in Alberta
2011 disestablishments in Alberta
Recurring sporting events established in 2010
Recurring sporting events disestablished in 2011